Colonel General Rajabali Rahmonali, born as Rajabali Fayzalievich Rakhmonaliev is a military leader in the armed forces of Tajikistan. Since 2013, he has been the chief of the Tajik Border Troops.

Career 
He was born on 7 October 1967 in Danghara, a town in the Khatlon Region of the Tajik SSR and the capital of the Danghara District. In 1989, he graduated from the Tallinn Higher Military-Political Construction School, majoring in military-political specialization. From August 1989 to March 1992, he served as an officer in the ranks of the Soviet Army. During his service, he was based in Chelyabinsk and the Kazakh SSR. 

In March 1992, he joined the Tajik National Army, serving in the Ministry of Defense in the positions of deputy military commissar. During the Tajikistani Civil War, he served in a detachment in the Popular Front of Tajikistan. He was one of the leaders of the liberation of Dushanbe. In 1997, he became the commander of the 7th Airborne Assault Brigade. In 2004 he graduated from the Combined Arms Academy of the Armed Forces of the Russian Federation with a degree in Combined Arms Units and Formations Management. In January 2004, he became Commander of the National Guard, replacing Ghaffor Mirzoyev. On 20 November 2013, he was appointed First Deputy Chairman of the State Committee for National Security, which concurrently comes with the posts of Head of the Main Directorate of the Border Troops and Commander of the Border Troops of the SCNS.

Personal life 
He holds the following state awards: Order "Spitamen" (1997), Order of Glory (1999), and the Order "Zarrintoj II degree" (2013). He is married with five children. He is a nephew of President Emomali Rahmon, In 2020, he was infected with COVID-19, and was hospitalized with pneumonia.

References 

Living people
1967 births
Tajikistani generals